Chalain may refer to:

Places

In France
 Chalain-d'Uzore, in the Loire département
 Chalain-le-Comtal, in the Loire département
 Lac de Chalain, lake in the Jura département